13 Monocerotis (13 Mon) is a class A0 Ib (white supergiant) star in the constellation Monoceros.

13 Mon lies within the Monoceros OB1 stellar association, halfway between the Rosette Nebula and NGC 2264, at a distance of about 780 parsecs. It is surrounded by a small reflection nebula listed as Van den Bergh 81 (VdB 81).

13 Monocerotis has been used as a standard star for the A0 Ib spectral class.

Extended photometry of 13 Monocerotis from 1997 to 2000 shows irregular variation of up to 0.04 magnitudes and also a slight trend to become fainter over the period. All the bright A0 - A5 supergiants analysed using Hipparcos satellite data were found to be variable, but 13 Mon was the least variable.

References

Monoceros (constellation)
A-type supergiants
BD+07 1337
Monocerotis, 13
031216
2385
046300
Reflection nebulae
Suspected variables